Fighter Squadron 40 or VF-40 was an aviation unit of the United States Navy. Originally established on 15 June 1943, it was disestablished on 19 November 1945. It was the only US Navy squadron to be designated as VF-40.

Operational history
VF-40 equipped with the F6F Hellcat supported the New Georgia Campaign deploying to Henderson Field on Guadalcanal in September 1943. While deployed in the Solomon Islands during 1943, VF-40 shot down 4 Japanese aircraft. VF-40 later supported the Borneo campaign (1945).

See also
History of the United States Navy
List of inactive United States Navy aircraft squadrons
List of United States Navy aircraft squadrons
Espiritu Santo Naval Base

References

Strike fighter squadrons of the United States Navy